Captain George Vancouver (22 June 1757 – 10 May 1798) was a British Royal Navy officer best known for his 1791–1795 expedition, which explored and charted North America's northwestern Pacific Coast regions, including the coasts of what are now the Canadian province of British Columbia as well as the US states of Alaska, Washington and Oregon. He also explored the Hawaiian Islands and the southwest coast of Australia.

Vancouver Island, the city of Vancouver in British Columbia, Vancouver, Washington in the United States, Mount Vancouver on the Canadian–US border between Yukon and Alaska, and New Zealand's fourth-highest mountain, also Mount Vancouver, are all named after him.

Early life

George Vancouver was born in the seaport town of King's Lynn (Norfolk, England) on 22 June 1757 - the sixth and youngest child of John Jasper Vancouver, a Dutch-born deputy collector of customs, and Bridget Berners. He came from an old respected family. The surname Vancouver comes from Coevorden, Drenthe province, Netherlands (Koevern in Dutch Low Saxon).

In 1771, at the age of 13, Vancouver entered the Royal Navy as a "young gentleman", a future candidate for midshipman. He was nominally an able seaman (AB) but, in reality, sailed as one of the midshipmen aboard , on James Cook's second voyage (1772–1775) searching for Terra Australis. He also sailed with Cook's third voyage (1776–1780), this time aboard Resolutions companion ship, and was present during the first European sighting and exploration of the Hawaiian Islands. Upon his return to Britain in October 1780 Vancouver was commissioned as a lieutenant and posted aboard the sloop  – initially on escort and patrol duty in the English Channel and North Sea. He accompanied the ship when it left Plymouth on 11 February 1782 for the West Indies. On 7 May 1782 he was appointed fourth lieutenant of the 74-gun ship of the line , which was at the time part of the British West Indies Fleet and assigned to patrolling the French-held Leeward Islands. Vancouver subsequently saw action at the Battle of the Saintes (April 1782), wherein he distinguished himself. Vancouver returned to England in June 1783.

In the late 1780s the Spanish Empire commissioned an expedition to the Pacific Northwest. In 1789 the Nootka Crisis developed, and Spain and Britain came close to war over ownership of Nootka Sound on contemporary Vancouver Island, and – of greater importance – over the right to colonise and settle the Pacific Northwest coast. Henry Roberts had recently taken command of the survey ship  (a new vessel named in honour of the ship on Cook's voyage) with the prospect of another round-the-world voyage, and Roberts selected Vancouver as his first lieutenant, but they both were then posted to other warships due to the crisis. Vancouver went with Joseph Whidbey to the 74-gun ship of the line . When the first Nootka Convention ended the crisis in 1790, Vancouver was given command of Discovery to take possession of Nootka Sound and to survey the coasts.

Explorations

Vancouver Expedition

In its first year the expedition travelled to Cape Town, Australia, New Zealand, Tahiti, and Hawaii, collecting botanical samples and surveying coastlines along the way. He formally claimed at Possession Point, King George Sound Western Australia, now the town of Albany, Western Australia for the British. Proceeding to North America, Vancouver followed the coasts of present-day Oregon and Washington northward. In April 1792 he encountered American Captain Robert Gray off the coast of Oregon just prior to Gray's sailing up the Columbia River.

Vancouver entered the Strait of Juan de Fuca, between Vancouver Island and the present-day Washington state mainland, on 29 April 1792. His orders included a survey of every inlet and outlet on the west coast of the mainland, all the way north to Alaska. Most of this work was in small craft propelled by both sail and oar; manoeuvring larger sail-powered vessels in uncharted waters was generally impractical and dangerous.

Vancouver named many features for his officers, friends, associates, and his ship Discovery, including:
 Mount Baker – after Discovery's 3rd Lieutenant Joseph Baker, the first on the expedition to spot it
 Mount St. Helens –  after his friend, Alleyne Fitzherbert, 1st Baron St Helens
 Puget Sound – after Discovery's 2nd lieutenant Peter Puget, who explored its southern reaches.
 Mount Rainier –  after his friend, Rear Admiral Peter Rainier.
 Port Gardner and Port Susan, Washington –  after his former commander Vice Admiral Sir Alan Gardner and his wife Susannah, Lady Gardner.
 Whidbey Island – after naval engineer Joseph Whidbey.
 Discovery Passage, Discovery Island, Discovery Bay, Port Discovery and Discovery Park (Seattle).

After a Spanish expedition in 1791, Vancouver was the second European to enter Burrard Inlet on 13 June 1792, naming it for his friend Sir Harry Burrard. It is the present day main harbour area of the City of Vancouver beyond Stanley Park. He surveyed Howe Sound and Jervis Inlet over the next nine days. Then, on his 35th birthday on 22 June 1792, he returned to Point Grey, the present-day location of the University of British Columbia. Here he unexpectedly met a Spanish expedition led by Dionisio Alcalá Galiano and Cayetano Valdés y Flores. Vancouver was "mortified" (his word) to learn they already had a crude chart of the Strait of Georgia based on the 1791 exploratory voyage of José María Narváez the year before, under command of Francisco de Eliza. For three weeks they cooperatively explored the Georgia Strait and the Discovery Islands area before sailing separately towards Nootka Sound.

After the summer surveying season ended, in August 1792, Vancouver went to Nootka, then the region's most important harbour, on contemporary Vancouver Island. Here he was to receive any British buildings and lands returned by the Spanish from claims by Francisco de Eliza for the Spanish crown. The Spanish commander, Juan Francisco Bodega y Quadra, was very cordial and he and Vancouver exchanged the maps they had made, but no agreement was reached; they decided to await further instructions. At this time, they decided to name the large island on which Nootka was now proven to be located as Quadra and Vancouver Island. Years later, as Spanish influence declined, the name was shortened to simply Vancouver Island.

While at Nootka Sound Vancouver acquired Robert Gray's chart of the lower Columbia River. Gray had entered the river during the summer before sailing to Nootka Sound for repairs. Vancouver realised the importance of verifying Gray's information and conducting a more thorough survey. In October 1792, he sent Lieutenant William Robert Broughton with several boats up the Columbia River. Broughton got as far as the Columbia River Gorge, sighting and naming Mount Hood.

Vancouver sailed south along the coast of Spanish Alta California, visiting Chumash villages at Point Conception and near Mission San Buenaventura. In November, he entered San Francisco Bay, later visiting Monterey; in both places, he was warmly received by the Spanish. Vancouver spent the winter in continuing exploration of the Sandwich Islands, the contemporary islands of Hawaii.

Further explorations
The next year, 1793, he returned to British Columbia and proceeded further north, unknowingly missing the overland explorer Alexander Mackenzie by only 48 days. He got to 56°30'N, having explored north from Point Menzies in Burke Channel to the northwest coast of Prince of Wales Island. He sailed around the latter island, as well as circumnavigating Revillagigedo Island and charting parts of the coasts of Mitkof, Zarembo, Etolin, Wrangell, Kuiu and Kupreanof Islands. With worsening weather, he sailed south to Alta California, hoping to find Bodega y Quadra and fulfil his territorial mission, but the Spaniard was not there. The Spanish governor refused to let a foreign official into the interior. Vancouver noted that the region's "only defenses against foreign attack are a few poor cannons". He again spent the winter in the Sandwich Islands.

In 1794, he first went to Cook Inlet, the northernmost point of his exploration, and from there followed the coast south. Boat parties charted the east coasts of Chichagof and Baranof Islands, circumnavigated Admiralty Island, explored to the head of Lynn Canal, and charted the rest of Kuiu Island and nearly all of Kupreanof Island. He then set sail for Great Britain by way of Cape Horn, returning in September 1795, thus completing a circumnavigation of South America.

Later life

Impressed by the view from Richmond Hill, Vancouver retired to Petersham, London.

Vancouver faced difficulties when he returned home to England. The accomplished and politically well-connected naturalist Archibald Menzies complained that his servant had been pressed into service during a shipboard emergency; sailing master Joseph Whidbey had a competing claim for pay as expedition astronomer; and Thomas Pitt, 2nd Baron Camelford, whom Vancouver had disciplined for numerous infractions and eventually sent home in disgrace, proceeded to harass him publicly and privately.

Pitt's allies, including his cousin, Prime Minister William Pitt the Younger, attacked Vancouver in the press. Thomas Pitt took a more direct approach; on 29 August 1796 he sent Vancouver a letter heaping many insults on the head of his former captain, and challenging him to a duel. Vancouver gravely replied that he was unable "in a private capacity to answer for his public conduct in his official duty," and offered instead to submit to formal examination by flag officers. Pitt chose instead to stalk Vancouver, ultimately assaulting him on a London street corner. The terms of their subsequent legal dispute required both parties to keep the peace, but nothing stopped Vancouver's civilian brother Charles from interposing and giving Pitt blow after blow until onlookers restrained the attacker. Charges and counter-charges flew in the press, with the wealthy Camelford faction having the greater firepower until Vancouver, ailing from his long naval service, died.

Death
Vancouver, at one time amongst Britain's greatest explorers and navigators, died in obscurity on 10 May 1798 at the age of 40, less than three years after completing his voyages and expeditions. No official cause of death was stated, as the medical records pertaining to Vancouver were destroyed; one doctor named John Naish claimed Vancouver died from kidney failure, while others believed it was a hyperthyroid condition. His grave is in the churchyard of St Peter's Church, Petersham, in the London Borough of Richmond upon Thames, England. The Hudson's Bay Company placed a memorial plaque in the church in 1841. His grave in Portland stone, renovated in the 1960s, is now Grade II listed in view of its historical associations.

Legacy

Navigation

Vancouver determined that the Northwest Passage did not exist at the latitudes that had long been suggested. His charts of the North American northwest coast were so extremely accurate that they served as the key reference for coastal navigation for generations. Robin Fisher, the academic vice-president of Mount Royal University in Calgary and author of two books on Vancouver, states:

However, Vancouver failed to discover two of the largest and most important rivers on the Pacific coast, the Fraser River and the Columbia River. He also missed the Skeena River near Prince Rupert in northern British Columbia. Vancouver did eventually learn of the river before he finished his survey—from Robert Gray, captain of the American merchant ship that conducted the first Euroamerican sailing of the Columbia River on 11 May 1792, after first sighting it on an earlier voyage in 1788. However it and the Fraser River never made it onto Vancouver's charts.
Stephen R. Bown, noted in Mercator's World magazine (November/December 1999) that:

While it is difficult to comprehend how Vancouver missed the Fraser River, much of this river's delta was subject to flooding and summer freshet which prevented the captain from spotting any of its great channels as he sailed the entire shoreline from Point Roberts, Washington, to Point Grey in 1792. The Spanish expeditions to the Pacific Northwest, with the 1791 Francisco de Eliza expedition preceding Vancouver by a year, had also missed the Fraser River although they knew from its muddy plume that there was a major river located nearby.

Indigenous peoples
Vancouver generally established a good rapport with both Indigenous peoples and European trappers. Historical records show Vancouver enjoyed good relations with native leaders both in Hawaii – with King Kamehameha I as well as the Pacific Northwest and California. Vancouver's journals exhibit a high degree of sensitivity to the indigenous populations he encountered. He wrote of meeting the Chumash people, and of his exploration of a small island on the Californian coast on which an important burial site was marked by a sepulchre of "peculiar character" lined with boards and fragments of military instruments lying near a square box covered with mats. Vancouver states:

Vancouver also displayed contempt in his journals towards unscrupulous western traders who provided guns to natives, writing:

Robin Fisher notes that Vancouver's "relationships with aboriginal groups were generally peaceful; indeed, his detailed survey would not have been possible if they had been hostile." While there were hostile incidents at the end of Vancouver's last season – the most serious of which involved a clash with the Tlingit people at Behm Canal in southeast Alaska in 1794 – these were the exceptions to Vancouver's exploration of the US and Canadian Northwest coast.

Despite a long history of warfare between Britain and Spain, Vancouver maintained excellent relations with his Spanish counterparts and even fêted a Spanish sea captain aboard his ship  during his 1792 trip to the Vancouver region.

Namesakes

Ship and cadet units
 HMCS Vancouver Halifax-class frigate of the Royal Canadian Navy (Named for the city, which is named for the man.)  
TS Vancouver, Australian Navy Cadets
 47 RCSCC CAPTAIN VANCOUVER, Royal Canadian Sea Cadets

Places
Many places around the world have been named after George Vancouver, including:

Australia
 Vancouver Peninsula, Cape Vancouver and Vancouver Breakers in King George Sound, Western Australia

Canada
 Mount Vancouver, in Yukon and neighbouring Alaska, eighth highest mountain in Canada
 Vancouver, British Columbia, a major city on the mainland in southwestern British Columbia, the province's largest city
 Vancouver Maritime Museum
 Vancouver Bay, British Columbia, in Jervis Inlet, East of Powell River, named after Vancouver when Capt. George H. Richards resurveyed the area in 1860.
 Vancouver Island, in British Columbia off the southwest coast of the mainland. North America's largest Pacific Island and location of the provincial capital at Victoria on its southern tip.

New Zealand
 Mount Vancouver, the sixth highest mountain in New Zealand.
 Vancouver Arm of Breaksea Sound, Fiordland, South Island

United Kingdom
 Vancouver Road in Ham, London, near Petersham, his place of burial

United States
 Vancouver, Washington, a city in southwest Washington across the Columbia River from Portland, Oregon
 Fort Vancouver, a Hudson's Bay Company trading post established in 1825

Memorials

 Statues of Vancouver are located in his birthplace of King's Lynn, in front of Vancouver City Hall, and on top of the dome of the British Columbia Parliament Buildings.
 The Vancouver Quarter Shopping Centre bears his name in King's Lynn.
 Canada Post issued a pair of 14-cent stamps to mark the 200th anniversary of Captain Cook's arrival at Nootka Sound on Vancouver Island on 26 April 1978. George Vancouver was a crewman on this voyage.
 Gate to the Northwest Passage, a commemorative statue by Vancouver artist Alan Chung Hung was commissioned by Parks Canada and installed at the mouth of False Creek in Vanier Park near the Vancouver Maritime Museum in 1980.
 Canada Post issued a 37-cent stamp inscribed Vancouver Explores the Coast on 17 March 1988. It was one of a set of four stamps issued to honour Exploration of Canada – Recognizers.
 The George Vancouver Rose, named in his honour and hybridised by Agriculture and Agri-Food Canada.
 First Capital Connect named Class 365 unit 365514 Captain George Vancouver, operating on the route between King's Lynn and London.
 Virgin CrossCountry named Class 221 unit 221129 George Vancouver in 2003, it was denamed on transfer to Arriva CrossCountry in 2007.

 A commemorative monument is located on the beach in North Kihei, Maui, Hawaii, commemorating George Vancouver's contribution of coffee and root vegetables to the islands of Hawaii, inscribed by Pierre Elliot Trudeau 2 December 1967.
 Statue of George Vancouver (2000), Vancouver, Washington

Many collections were made on the voyage: one was donated by Archibald Menzies to the British Museum 1796; another made by surgeon George Goodman Hewett (1765–1834) was donated by Augustus Wollaston Franks to the British Museum in 1891. An account of these has been published.

250th birthday commemorations
 Canada Post issued a $1.55 postage stamp to commemorate the 250th anniversary of Vancouver's birth, on 22 June 2007. The stamp has an embossed image of Vancouver seen from behind as he gazes forward towards a mountainous coastline. This may be the first Canadian stamp not to show the subject's face.

The City of Vancouver in Canada organised a celebration to commemorate the 250th anniversary of Vancouver's birth, in June 2007 at the Vancouver Maritime Museum. The one-hour festivities included the presentation of a massive 63 by 114 centimetre carrot cake, the firing of a gun salute by the Royal Canadian Artillery's 15th Field Regiment and a performance by the Vancouver Firefighter's Band.
Vancouver's then-mayor, Sam Sullivan, officially declared 22 June 2007 to be "George Day".

The Musqueam (xʷməθkʷəy̓əm) Elder sɁəyeɬəq (Larry Grant) attended the festivities and acknowledged that some of his people might disapprove of his presence, but also noted:

Origins of the family name
There has been some debate about the origins of the Vancouver name. It is now commonly accepted that the name Vancouver derives from the expression van Coevorden, meaning "(originating) from Coevorden", a city in the northeast of the Netherlands. This city is apparently named after the "Coeverden" family of the 13th–15th century.

In the 16th century, a number of businessmen from the Coevorden area (and the rest of the Netherlands) moved to England. Some of them were known as Van Coeverden. Others adopted the surname Oxford, as in oxen fording (a river), which is approximately the English translation of Coevorden. However, it is not the exact name of the noble family mentioned in the history books that claim Vancouver's noble lineage: that name was Coeverden not Coevorden.

In the 1970s, Adrien Mansvelt, a former consul general of the Netherlands based in Vancouver, published a collation of information in both historical and genealogical journals and in the Vancouver Sun newspaper. Mansvelt's theory was later presented by the city during the Expo 86 World's Fair, as historical fact. The information was then used by historian W. Kaye Lamb in his book A Voyage of Discovery to the North Pacific Ocean and Round the World, 1791–1795 (1984).

W. Kaye Lamb, in summarising Mansvelt's 1973 research, observes evidence of close family ties between the Vancouver family of Britain and the Van Coeverden family of the Netherlands as well as George Vancouver's own words from his diaries in referring to his Dutch ancestry:

In 2006 John Robson, a librarian at the University of Waikato, conducted his own research into George Vancouver's ancestry, which he published in an article in the British Columbia History journal. Robson theorises that Vancouver's forebears may have been Flemish rather than Dutch; he believes that Vancouver is descended from the Vangover family of Ipswich in Suffolk and Colchester in Essex. Those towns had a significant Flemish population in the 16th and 17th centuries.

George Vancouver named the south point of what is now Couverden Island, Alaska, Point Couverden during his exploration of the North American Pacific coast, in honour of his family's hometown of Coevorden. It is located at the western point of entry to Lynn Canal in southeastern Alaska.

Works by George Vancouver
The Admiralty instructed Vancouver to publish a narrative of his voyage which he started to write in early 1796 in Petersham. At the time of his death the manuscript covered the period up to mid-1795. The work, A Voyage of Discovery to the North Pacific Ocean, and Round the World, was completed by his brother John and published in three volumes in the autumn of 1798. A second edition was published in 1801 in six volumes.  
 A Voyage of Discovery to the North Pacific Ocean: And Round the World, Volume 1
 A Voyage of Discovery to the North Pacific Ocean: And Round the World, Volume 2
 A Voyage of Discovery to the North Pacific Ocean: And Round the World, Volume 3

A modern annotated edition (1984) by W. Kaye Lamb was renamed The Voyage of George Vancouver 1791–1795, and published in four volumes by the Hakluyt Society of London, England.

See also
 European and American voyages of scientific exploration

References

Further reading
 Godwin, George. "Captain George Vancouver, 1757–1798." History Today (Sep 1957) 7#9 pp 605–609. 
 Bown, Stephen R. Madness, Betrayal and the Lash: The Epic Voyage of Captain George Vancouver (Douglas & McIntyre 2008).
 Godwin, George. Vancouver A Life: 1757–1798 (D. Appleton and Company, 1931).
The Life and Voyages of Captain George Vancouver by Bern Anderson. Published by University of Washington Press, 1966.
Captain Vancouver: A Portrait of His Life by Alison Gifford. Published by St. James Press, 1986.
Journal of the Voyages of the H.M.S. Discovery and Chatham by Thomas Manby. Published by Ye Galleon Press, 1988.
Vancouver's Voyage: Charting the Northwest Coast, 1791–1795 by Robin Fisher and Gary Fiegehen. Published by Douglas & McIntyre, 1992.
On Stormy Seas, The Triumphs and Torments of Captain George Vancouver by B. Guild Gillespie. Published by Horsdal & Schubart, 1992.
Captain Vancouver: North-West Navigator by E.C. Coleman. Published by Tempus, 2007.
Sailing with Vancouver: A Modern Sea Dog, Antique Charts and a Voyage Through Time by Sam McKinney. Published by Touchwood Editions, 2004.
The Early Exploration of Inland Washington Waters: Journals and Logs from Six Expeditions, 1786–1792 edited by Richard W. Blumenthal. Published by McFarland & Company, 2004.
A Discovery Journal: George Vancouver's First Survey Season – 1792 by John E. Roberts. Published by Trafford Publishing, 2005.
With Vancouver in Inland Washington Waters: Journals of 12 Crewmen April–June 1792 edited by Richard W. Blumenthal. Published by McFarland & Company, 2007.

External links

Biography at the Dictionary of Canadian Biography Online
 
George Vancouver (1757–1798), Explorer, illustrations in the National Portrait Gallery.
The True Meaning of Vancouver  – Etymology of his name.
interactive Google map showing the path Vancouver followed during his 11-day survey of the southwest coast of British Columbia
Coevorden: What connection does Vancouver have with Coevorden, an industrial town of about 20,000 in the northeast Netherlands? - The History of Metropolitan Vancouver website. (Retrieved on 11 June 2007)

Vancouver History – Including historic street video of Vancouver from 1907.
 

1757 births
1798 deaths
18th-century Royal Navy personnel
18th-century explorers
18th-century English people
Burials at St Peter's, Petersham
English explorers
English explorers of North America
English explorers of the Pacific
English hydrographers
English people of Dutch descent
Explorers of Alaska
Explorers of British Columbia
Explorers of California
Explorers of Canada
Explorers of Oregon
Explorers of Washington (state)
History of Bellingham, Washington
James Cook
Military personnel from Norfolk
Mount Rainier
People from King's Lynn
Persons of National Historic Significance (Canada)
Pre-Confederation British Columbia people
Royal Navy officers